General Ocampo is a department of La Rioja Province (Argentina).

Settlements 

 Ambil
 Dique de Anzulon
 El Milagro
 Olpas
 Villa Santa Rita de Catuna

References 

Departments of La Rioja Province, Argentina